Survivor South Africa: Malaysia is the second season of the reality television show Survivor South Africa. The series is very similar to the American version of the show, with two teams (and later one group) of contestants vying for a large sum of money while stranded in a remote location. Each episode, one contestant is voted off of the show by his or her comrades, whittling the group down until only one survivor remains.

Many changes were announced for the second season by M-Net, which airs the show. This included the addition of two contestants, a shorter filming period (27 days), the change in location (Johor, Malaysia), and a pre-show vote by South African citizens to choose one of the contestants. However, the show's format remained much the same, with the prize set at 1,000,000 Rand.  Mark Bayly hosted this season.

The application process ended on 2 April 2007. According to M-Net's website, two thirds of the entries in 2007 were from males. The percentage of applicants in the 40-59 age group was also higher than in 2006, and the 20 oldest applicants were 77 years old. This may quell another concern that emerged in the first season: that all of the contestants had backgrounds that were too similar. The 16th contestant, Lorette Mostert, was voted in by South Africans via M-Net's website between 23 and 30 April 2007. Filming began in mid-May and ended in June. The show was initially broadcast 22 August – 14 November 2007.

Contestants

One of the castaways – Lorette Mostert – was chosen by fans as a wildcard.

Notes

Season summary
With a larger cast of 16 players, the season began with two tribes of eight, Bajau and Iban. Bajau started off the game divided between two factions; those who worked harder to build and look after their camp, and the rest who were more interested in the strategic game. The strategic Bajau united under Elsie and Rijesh to vote out the oldest female worker of the tribe, Nicole, to keep the begrudging provider of the tribe, Hein, to keep the tribe looked after for challenges. At Iban, an alliance between Grant, Lorette (the public wildcard winner), Mandla, Angie, and Viwe were starting to form, until the Malaysian conditions led to Viwe becoming erratic about his allegiances, sending him home early over the Iban outsider, Lisa.

A sudden tribe shuffle at the fourth immunity challenge saw Bajau become a physically overpowering tribe, with Elsie being injured at the challenge where she needed immediate medical attention. The loss also saw the new Iban tribe be sent to a daytime Tribal Council immediately after the challenge, where her own original Bajau allies chose to vote Elsie out to make sure she got the medical intervention she needed despite being in the majority. With his biggest ally gone, Rijesh was voted out shortly after as fellow Bajau, Amanda, grew suspicious of his strategic prowess. The new Bajau saw Grant and Hein agree to a mutual truce to help pick off Nichal and Lisa as tribe and alliance outsiders. Shortly before the merge, an outnumbered Angie in the new Iban tribe started to get restless, and sided with the Bajau originals to vote out Irshaad, as his energetic behaviour kept disrupting camp life and yielding challenge losses for Iban.

The tribes merged on Day 18 to form Empu, with 4 original Bajau and Iban members sticking to their original tribal lines. A tie-breaker challenge between Hein and Lorette saw Hein fumble his way out of the game, giving the Iban alliance majority. Fellow Bajau, Dyke and Angela, were sent to the jury back-to-back, until at the Final 5, Angie's boredom with her alliance's control of the merge started to alienate Lorette and her closest ally, Mandla. Bringing in Amanda, Lorette and Mandla blindsided their own alliance to take out Angie for her unpredictable loyalties. On Day 26, the Final Four competed in another balancing endurance challenge (repeating the Final Four challenge in Panama), where Mandla shockingly fell into the water first, sending him to the jury, while Lorette won immunity for the penultimate Tribal Council. Despite giving Amanda an opportunity to plead her case over her alliance leader, Grant, Lorette voted out Amanda, concerned that her status as the last surviving Bajau member would give her a strong case at Final Tribal Council.

The Final Tribal Council saw the jury interrogate Grant's strategic game as the leader of the Iban alliance, pointing out that Lorette never broke her loyalties with Mandla while keeping up a good work ethic in her tribes throughout the game. In the end, the jury decided to reward Lorette for her general ethic around camp and her need as a police officer for the grand prize financially, over Grant, making Lorette South Africa's second Ultimate Survivor.

Voting history

Notes

External links
Official Site
Sole Survivor Blog
Survivor South Africa: Malaysia on TVSA
Survivor South Africa Mini-Site on TVSA

2007 South African television seasons
Survivor South Africa seasons
Television shows filmed in Malaysia